Two ships of the US Navy have been named USS Alarm. 
 , a torpedo boat.
Transferred to the Soviet Union under lend-lease in 1943 as the T-113, scrapped on 14 March 1960

United States Navy ship names